Christopher Brubeck is an American musician and composer, both in jazz and classical music. As a musician, he mainly plays electric bass, bass trombone, and piano. The son of noted jazz pianist and composer Dave Brubeck, in 1972 he joined his father and brothers Darius and Daniel in The New Brubeck Quartet. He later formed The Brubeck Brothers Quartet with his brothers.

Overview
Chris Brubeck has been touring for about 30 years with guitarist Joel Brown and singer and harmonica virtuoso Peter Madcat Ruth as a group called "Triple Play", a jazz band in a swinging Louisiana style.

Known as a member of "New Heavenly Blue", Chris also participated and recorded as a keyboardist/trombonist/guitarist in "Educated Homegrown" in 1970.

In 1999, Chris Brubeck and his brother Daniel Brubeck joined with other musicians to form The Brubeck Brothers Quartet; the brothers previously had briefly partnered with Andy LaVerne for a 1972 album as "The Brubeck-LaVerne Trio".  While they have performed with various other musicians, as of 2018, the quartet includes Mike DeMicco on guitar, Chuck Lamb on piano, Daniel Brubeck on drums, and Chris Brubeck on electric bass and bass trombone.  The quartet performs in jazz venues and with symphony orchestras around the world The quartet released its fifth album since 2001 in the spring of 2018.

In 2003, Chris played his first "Concerto for Bass Trombone and Orchestra" with the Czech national Symphony Orchestra in Prague.  A year later, he composed his own concerto titled, The Prague Concerto for Bass Trombone and Orchestra.

Many of his classical compositions still contain strong hints of the jazz influence of his father.

When Chris Brubeck was born, Dave Brubeck wrote for him the composition "Crazy Chris". In 1982, after Chris and his first wife Noreen had their son Ben, Dave Brubeck dedicated to his first grandchild the composition "Benjamin Christopher David Brubeck". Chris Brubeck later married his second and current wife, Tish Brubeck (Theresa Wolf Smith Brubeck).

Discography
Across Your Dreams: Frederica von Stade Sings Brubeck, with Edward Arron (cello), Frank Brown (clarinet), Joel Brown (guitar, vocals), Dan Brubeck (drums, percussion), Bill Crofut (banjo, vocals), Jenny Elkus (vocals) and Msrk Vinci (flute), Telarc, 1996

Sources
 Chris Brubeck biography at his website
 Chris Brubeck biography at his agency

References

External links
 Brubeck Music.com - official website for the musical Brubeck Family--- Dave, Chris, Darius, Dan & Matt
 
 

 Interviews
 "The Son Also Rises: Chris Brubeck, the new Gershwin?" - late 2003 interview by Dr. Judith Schlesinger at All About Jazz

21st-century trombonists
20th-century American male musicians
21st-century American male musicians
20th-century American bass guitarists
Living people
American jazz composers
American male jazz composers
American jazz bass guitarists
American jazz trombonists
Male trombonists
Interlochen Center for the Arts alumni
MNRK Music Group artists
Guitarists from Los Angeles
American male bass guitarists
Jazz musicians from California
Year of birth missing (living people)
Dave Brubeck Quartet members